Wongaksa is a temple located in Gigye-myeon, Pohang, Gyeongsangbuk-do, South Korea.

References 

Buddhist temples in South Korea
Pohang
Buildings and structures in North Gyeongsang Province